Nazarovo is a rural locality (a village) in Sizemskoye Rural Settlement, Sheksninsky District, Vologda Oblast, Russia. The population was 13 as of 2002.

Geography 
Nazarovo is located 25 km northeast of Sheksna (the district's administrative centre) by road. Stupnovo is the nearest rural locality.

References 

Rural localities in Sheksninsky District